DE24 may refer to:
 Delaware Route 24
 , a World War II destroyer escort
 , a World War II destroyer escort, sold in 1946 to Nationalist China and renamed ROCS Tai Chong (DE-24)
 DE24, a postcode district in Derby, England; see DE postcode area